Thakurgaon Airport  was a public and military STOL airport located near Shibganj of Thakurgaon, Bangladesh. The airport was established in 1940 on 550 acres. This airstrip was heavily damaged by the Indian Air Force during the Indo-Pakistani War of 1965.

The airport was renovated in 1977, and some commercial flights operated there for few years. Due to a lack of interest and a decreasing number of passengers, it went out of operation and was abandoned in 1980. No scheduled flights are available for this airport.

See also
 List of airports in Bangladesh

References

External links 
Airport record for Thakurgaon Airport at Landings.com
Airports in Bangladesh at Civil Aviation Authority of Bangladesh.

Airports in Bangladesh